Maud Watson defeated her elder sister Lilian Watson 6–8, 6–3, 6–3 to win the inaugural Ladies' Singles tennis title at the 1884 Wimbledon Championships.

Draw

Draw

References

External links

Ladies' Singles
Wimbledon Championship by year – Women's singles
Wimbledon Championships - Singles
Wimbledon Championships - Singles